Carlos Nascimento may refer to:
 Carlos Nascimento (footballer)
 Carlos Nascimento (athlete)
 Carlos Nascimento (journalist)
 Carlos Henrique Rodrigues do Nascimento, Brazilian basketball player